Inolvidable (Unforgettable) or variants may refer to:

Film and TV
 La inolvidable, a Venezuelan telenovela

Music

Albums
 Inolvidable, a 1999 album by Diego Verdaguer
 Inolvidable, a reissue of Unforgettable, a 2005 compilation album by American singer Selena
 Inolvidables, Los Ángeles Azules 1996
 15 Inolvidables (disambiguation)
 20 Inolvidables (disambiguation)
 30 Inolvidables (disambiguation)
Inolvidables, a 1992 album by Roberto Carlos

Songs
 "Inolvidable" (song), a 1944 bolero written by Julio Gutiérrez in 1944, covered by Luis Miguel 1992
 "Inolvidable", the Spanish version of "Incancellabile", a 1996 song performed by Italian singer Laura Pausini
 "Inolvidable" (Reik song), a 2008 song performed by Mexican band Reik from the album Un Día Más
 "Inolvidable", a 2008 song by Jenni Rivera from her album Mi Vida Loca